Charles Gordon Ward (23 September 1875 – 27 June 1954) was an English first-class cricketer. Ward was a right-handed batsman.

Ward made his first-class debut for Hampshire in the 1897 County Championship against Warwickshire at Edgbaston. Ward played 14 first-class matches for Hampshire between 1897 and 1901, with his final match for Hampshire coming in the 1901 County Championship against Somerset at the County Ground, Taunton. In Ward's 14 first-class matches for the county he scored 186 runs at a batting average of 8.08, with a high score of 30. With the ball, Ward took 2 wickets at a bowling average of 67.50, with best figures of 1/17. In the field Ward took 3 catches.

In 1907 Ward joined Lincolnshire, where he made his Minor Counties Championship for Lincolnshire against the Lancashire Second XI. From 1907 to 1911 Ward played 27 Minor Counties matches for the county, with his final match for Lincolnshire coming against Hertfordshire in 1911.

In 1912 Ward joined Hertfordshire, where he made his debut for the club in that seasons Minor Counties Championship against Bedfordshire. Before the First World War, Ward played 14 matches for the county. After the First World War Ward returned to play for Hertfordshire, with his final match for the county coming in 1922 against Buckinghamshire.

Ward died at South Ormsby, Lincolnshire on 27 June 1954.

Family
Ward's brother Herbert Ward played first-class cricket for Hampshire as well playing football for Southampton. Ward's cousin Leonard Ward played single a first-class match for Derbyshire in 1899.

References

External links

Matches and detailed statistics for Charles Ward

1875 births
1954 deaths
People from Braughing
Cricketers from Hertfordshire
English cricketers
Hampshire cricketers
Lincolnshire cricketers
Hertfordshire cricketers